Bacidia biatorina is a species of fungus belonging to the family Ramalinaceae.

References

Ramalinaceae